Puya kuntzeana is a species in the genus Puya. This species is endemic to Bolivia.

References

kuntzeana
Flora of Bolivia